The 2004–05 season was the 105th season in Società Sportiva Lazio's history and their 17th consecutive season in the top-flight of Italian football.

Squad

Goalkeepers
  Angelo Peruzzi
  Fabrizio Casazza
  Matteo Sereni

Defenders
  Leonardo Talamonti
  Óscar López
  Sebastiano Siviglia
  Luciano Zauri
  Guerino Gottardi
  Massimo Oddo
  Paolo Negro
  Fernando Couto
  Anthony Šerić
  Matías Lequi

Midfielders
  Ousmane Dabo
  Antonio Filippini
  Dino Baggio
  Emanuele Filippini
  Giuliano Giannichedda
  Christian Manfredini
  Fabio Liverani
  Esteban González
  Miguel Mea Vitali

Attackers
  Paolo Di Canio
  Roberto Muzzi
  Tommaso Rocchi
  Goran Pandev
  Simone Inzaghi
  Fabio Bazzani

Transfers

Left club during season

Serie A

League table

Matches

Top Scorers
  Tommaso Rocchi 13
  Paolo Di Canio 6 (2)
  Massimo Oddo 4 (3)
  Fernando Couto 3
  Fabio Bazzani 3

UEFA Cup

First round

Group stage

References

S.S. Lazio seasons
Lazio